WASP-31b is a low-density (puffy) "hot Jupiter" extrasolar planet orbiting the metal-poor (63% of solar metallicity) dwarf star WASP-31. The exoplanet was discovered in 2010 by the WASP project. WASP-31b is in the constellation of Crater, and is about 1305 light-years (light travel distance) from Earth.

Characteristics
WASP-31b is a low-density (puffy) "hot Jupiter" exoplanet with a mass about 0.48 times that of Jupiter and a radius about 1.55 times that of Jupiter. The planetary atmosphere has indeed the largest scale height, equal to 1150km, among exoplanets with measurable atmospheres as at 2021.

The exoplanet orbits WASP-31, its host star, every 3.4 days. 

In 2012, it was found from the Rossiter–McLaughlin effect that WASP-31b is orbiting the parent star in a prograde direction, with the WASP-31 star rotational axis inclined to the planetary orbit by 2.8 degrees. The spectroscopic study in 2014 revealed that WASP-31b has a dense cloud deck overlaid by a hazy atmosphere. WASP-31b was also reported to have significant amounts of potassium in its upper atmosphere, but the detection of potassium was refuted in 2015. The potassium detection discrepancy was resolved in 2020 with the improved cloud deck model, with the best fit being a very small amount of water over clouds and no potassium at all.

Reanalysis of planetary spectroscopic data in 2020 has revealed the presence of chromium monohydride besides water.

See also
 WASP-6b
 WASP-17b
 WASP-19b
 WASP-39b
 WASP-121b

References

External links

Exoplanets discovered by WASP
Exoplanets discovered in 2010
Giant planets
Hot Jupiters
Crater (constellation)